Juwanna Mann is a 2002 American romantic comedy-drama film directed by Jesse Vaughan, written by Bradley Allenstein, produced by Bill Gerber, and starring Miguel A. Núñez Jr., Vivica A. Fox, Kevin Pollak, Tommy Davidson, Kim Wayans, Ginuwine, and Kimberly "Lil' Kim" Jones. It tells the tale of a basketball star becoming a female impersonator and joining women's basketball after being suspended from men's basketball. The movie opened in theaters on June 21, 2002. The movie was filmed in Charlotte, North Carolina, at the Charlotte Coliseum and the Independence Arena. The movie's soundtrack features music by Diana Ross, James Brown, Mystikal, Ginuwine, Lil' Kim and Stevie Wonder, and was score-composed by Wendy & Lisa. The film's title is a play on a phrase: "You want a man?"

Plot
Jamal Jeffries is a UBA (a fictionalized version of the NBA) basketball star whose undisciplined on-and-off-court antics have earned him a bad reputation in the basketball community. Jamal is dropped from his team, the Charlotte Beat and suspended indefinitely after he strips naked in protest of being removed a game. His agent Lorne Daniels is unsuccessful at finding him a new team and decides to cut Jamal as a client. Consequently, Jamal's life goes downhill: his endorsements drop him, he ends up bankrupt due to his lavish spending, his belongings are repossessed, his mansion is foreclosed on, and his girlfriend Tina, who only put up with his antics for his money and fame, walks out on him.

Now broke, jobless, and homeless, Jamal goes to live with his no-nonsense Aunt Ruby, the only woman that is willing to put up with Jamal in spite of his outrageous antics. Lacking any other sort of skills, he decides to dress up as a woman named "Juwanna Mann" to play for the Charlotte Banshees of the WUBA (a fictionalized version of the WNBA). Aunt Ruby reluctantly agrees to help her nephew with his charade as does Lorne, who has no choice but to help out after Jamal reveals himself to be Juwanna. In a scene involving the team physical, Jamal has to disguise himself as the team mascot in order to avoid being found out by the team physician.

As Juwanna, Jamal quickly becomes a star on the court, and his overall attitude changes drastically as well. He learns to play with a team rather than just himself. While becoming successful with the Banshees, Jamal also finds himself in a problematic relationship with his teammate Michelle, whom he has romantic feelings for but cannot act on because Michelle knows him only as her confidante, Juwanna. His situation is further complicated as Michelle is involved in a romantic relationship with rapper Romeo (who ends up cheating on her) while Jamal (as Juwanna) is busy warding off the amorous advances of Romeo's hyper sidekick Puff Smokey Smoke.

Eventually, Jamal is given a chance to return to the men's league, but the hearing takes place at the same time as the Banshees' first playoff game. After much debate, Jamal decides to do the selfless thing and stick with the Banshees and help them win. Jamal's cover is blown at the end of the game when Jamal decides to dunk the winning basket and shatters the backboard. Amidst the excitement, Jamal loses his wig, revealing his true identity, and is immediately fired from the team. Consequently, the Banshees, devastated at the betrayal, begin to suffer on the court.

Seeing this, Jamal decides to try to make things right again, and enters the Banshees' locker room during another game's halftime to apologize for the lies and deception, and tell them that playing with them had changed his views and attitude about basketball, women, and life in general. His ex-teammates (especially Michelle) are initially still furious at him, but ultimately end up accepting Jamal's genuine apology, which also inspires the team to win the playoffs and eventually the WUBA championship.

Afterwards, Jamal is called in for a hearing with the UBA's commission board. Despite the genuine apology and assurance by himself and Lorne that he has changed for the better, the board is still unimpressed due to the "Juwanna Mann scandal" and it initially appears that Jamal's playing career is truly over. In the nick of time, his former WUBA teammates show up and successfully vouch for him to be brought back into the league, and Michelle gives him a championship ring and a kiss.

Jamal is reinstated into the UBA and returns to action with the Charlotte Beat, a better player and a better man.

Cast
 Miguel A. Núñez Jr. as Jamal Jefferies / Juwanna Mann
 Vivica A. Fox as Michelle Langford
 Kevin Pollak as Lorne Daniels
 Kim Wayans as Latisha Jansen
 Ginuwine as Romeo
 Lil' Kim as Tina Parker
 Tommy Davidson as Puff Smokey Smoke
 J. Don Ferguson as UBA Referee
 Jenifer Lewis as Aunt Ruby
 Annie Corley as Coach Rivers
 Tammi Reiss as Vickie Sanchez
 Heather Quella as Magda Rowonowitch
 Itoro Coleman as Debbie Scruggs
 Rasheed Wallace as Whitley
 Vlade Divac as Morse
 Dikembe Mutombo as Coyner 
 Muggsy Bogues as Andrew Stewart
 Ric Reitz as Beat coach
 Omar Dorsey as Rickey
 Cynthia Cooper
Teresa Weatherspoon, Katy Steding, Jeanne Zelasko, Chris Myers, Roy Firestone, Kevin Frazier, Kenny Albert, and Jay Leno appear as themselves

Soundtrack
"Fame" – L.T. Hutton (opening credits song)
"What's Luv?" – Fat Joe ft. Ashanti (end credits song)

Reception
Juwanna Mann was not well received by critics, earning a 10% "rotten" rating on Rotten Tomatoes. The site's consensus reads "With its tired premise, Juwanna Manns jokes fall flat." On Metacritic, the film has a rank of 24 out of 100 based on 20 critics, indicating "generally unfavorable reviews".

Anna Smith of Empire Magazine wrote "There may be a lot of boobs out there on the court, but there's only one tit. As limp as it is lazy". A score of a "D" was awarded to the film by Owen Gleiberman of Entertainment Weekly who added, "A Tootsie-role sports farce that's a drag in every which way".

Chicago Tribunes Robert K. Elder called the film "tempting to call traveling", but also added that "it never goes anywhere". Ann Hornaday of The Washington Post had nothing more to add other than calling the film "Tired and flat as a dead basketball", while Carla Meyer of the San Francisco Chronicle called it a "misguided comedy".

Ed Gonzalez of Slant Magazine was rather shocked by the PG-13 rating of the film. He stated "Though significantly less crass and offensive than Sorority Boys, [the film] is rated PG-13 for "Lil' Kim's booty not included"".

Dennis Harvey of Variety called Juwanna Mann a "cross-dressing yokfest", comparing it to such films as Charley's Aunt, Some Like It Hot and Tootsie.

According to A. O. Scott of The New York Times "But even though, most of the time, you know exactly what will happen next -- you don't much mind. Nor do the many plot holes and improbabilities -- undermine its silly, raucous spirit".

A similar distaste felt in the UK, where Jamie Russell of BBC said: "This mess of a movie is nothing short of a travesty of a transvestite comedy".

See also
Cross-dressing in film and television

References

External links

2002 romantic comedy-drama films
2000s sports comedy-drama films
American romantic comedy-drama films
American screwball comedy films
American sports comedy-drama films
American basketball films
Cross-dressing in American films
Cultural depictions of Vlade Divac
2002 directorial debut films
Films shot in North Carolina
Morgan Creek Productions films
Warner Bros. films
2002 comedy films
2000s English-language films
2000s American films